Gergis may refer to the following:

Places
 in Africa
 Gergis, Libya, an ancient city and former bishopric in Libya, now called Zargis and remaining a Latin Catholic titular see as Gergis
 Gergis, Tunisia, an ancient city in Tunisia, now called Zarzis

 in Asia
 Gergis (Troad), a place from Antiquity on Mount Ida in the Troad, present-day northwest Anatolia (Turkey)

Person
 Gergis, son of Ariazus, a Persian general in Xerxes army